William Nelson (1878/9 – October 3, 1903) was an American inventor and an employee of General Electric in Schenectady, New York.

On the afternoon of October 3, 1903, in New York state, Nelson tested a new motorized bicycle he had invented. While trying out the motor bicycle on a hill opposite the home of his father-in-law, William H. Sterling, Nelson fell from the machine and was instantly killed at the age of 24.

References

1870s births
1903 deaths
Accidental deaths in New York (state)
Inventors killed by their own invention
20th-century American inventors
Year of birth missing